The Griswold National Bank is an historic building located in Griswold, Iowa, United States.

History 
F.H. Whitney established the Bank of Griswold in 1880.  Three years later it merged with the recently established First National Bank.  The two-story brick building was completed in 1885.  The bank operated out of this building until 1930 when it went into receivership. 

The building now houses the Cass County Historical Society Museum.  It was listed on the National Register of Historic Places in 1979.

References

Commercial buildings completed in 1898
Museums in Cass County, Iowa
National Register of Historic Places in Cass County, Iowa
Bank buildings on the National Register of Historic Places in Iowa